Working from Within: Chicana and Chicano Activist Educators in Whitestream Schools is a 2009 book on chicana/o studies by Luis Urrieta. It explores the role of chicana and chicano activist educators in changing educational practices and in helping to shape the identities of Mexican-American students.

References 

Chicano
University of Arizona Press books
2009 non-fiction books